Saint Peter and Saint Paul is a 1587-1592 painting by El Greco, one of several versions of the theme by the artist - others are now in Barcelona and Stockholm. It shows the apostles saint Peter and saint Paul. The work was once shown on a stamp produced by the USSR.

Bibliography
  ÁLVAREZ LOPERA, José, El Greco, Madrid, Arlanza, 2005, Biblioteca «Descubrir el Arte», (colección «Grandes maestros»). .
  SCHOLZ-HÄNSEL, Michael, El Greco, Colonia, Taschen, 2003. .

References

1580s paintings
1590s paintings
El Greco, St Petersburg
Paintings by El Greco
Paintings in the collection of the Hermitage Museum